Face the Music is an album by Melody Club released on August 25, 2004.

Track listing
Killing a Boy
Cats in the Dark
Take Me Away
Love Drive
Boys In The Girls' Room
Wildhearts
Baby
Summer Low
Breakaway
Winterland
Tomorrow is a Stranger

Chart positions

References

Melody Club albums
2004 albums